Amastus bicolor is a moth of the family Erebidae. It was described by Peter Maassen in 1890. It is found in Ecuador and Peru.

References

bicolor
Moths described in 1890
Moths of South America